Jassina Blom (born 3 September 1994) is a Belgian professional footballer who plays as a forward for UDG Tenerife and the Belgium national team.

Club career
In August 2021, her transfer to Spanish club UDG Tenerife from Dutch club PEC Zwolle was announced. She signed a two-year contract.

International career
Blom made her debut for the Belgium national team on 22 November 2014, coming on as a substitute for Tine De Caigny against Poland.

Career statistics

International

References

External links
 

1994 births
Living people
Women's association football forwards
Belgian women's footballers
Belgium women's international footballers
UD Granadilla Tenerife players
BeNe League players
Eredivisie (women) players
K.A.A. Gent (women) players
Club Brugge KV (women) players
SC Heerenveen (women) players
FC Twente (women) players
PEC Zwolle (women) players
Belgian expatriate women's footballers
Expatriate women's footballers in the Netherlands
Expatriate women's footballers in Spain
Belgian expatriate sportspeople in Spain